Battle Out Run is a 1989 videogame released by Sega on the Master System. Despite being part of the Out Run series, this game plays little like its namesake and more like Chase H.Q., where the objective is to ram the cars of specified criminals. A notable feature is to enhance the car's attributes by buying upgrades that are inside of a truck that passes at certain moments and must be entered from the rear.

Reception
Computer and Video Games reviewed the game in 1990, giving it an 80% score.

References

External links

1989 video games
Europe-exclusive video games
OutRun
Racing video games
Master System games
Master System-only games
Video games developed in Japan

Single-player video games